US Post Office-Lake Placid is a historic post office building located at Lake Placid in Essex County, New York, United States. It was designed and built 1935–1936, and is one of a number of post offices in New York State designed by the Office of the Supervising Architect of the Treasury Department under Louis A. Simon.  The building is in the Colonial Revival style and is a one-story, five-bay, steel-framed building on a raised foundation with a cast-stone watertable and clad in orange/buff-colored brick.  The interior features a group of murals executed in 1937 by Henry Billings.

It was listed on the National Register of Historic Places in 1988.

References

Lake Placid
Government buildings completed in 1935
Colonial Revival architecture in New York (state)
Buildings and structures in Essex County, New York
National Register of Historic Places in Essex County, New York